Mischocyttarus is a very large, primarily Neotropical genus of social wasps with a few species found also in the Nearctic region. It is the only member of the tribe Mischocyttarini; the asymmetrical tarsal lobes of Mischocyttarus separates it from the tribe Epiponini. Mischocyttarus is the largest genus of social wasps, containing over 200 species and subspecies. Mischocyttarus wasps build a relatively simple, single comb nest. Sometimes, the nest is built within a meter of the nest of Polistes carnifex. Foraging adults bring nectar and small caterpillars back to the nest to feed to the developing larvae which are individually housed in separate cells in the nest. Not all nests have a female with developed ovaries. Their biology is similar to that of species in the genus Polistes. However, Mischocyttarus appear to show considerably more social and reproductive flexibility than Polistes.

Species

 Mischocyttarus achagua Silveira, 2013
 Mischocyttarus acreanus Silveira, 2006
 Mischocyttarus acunai Alayo 1972
 Mischocyttarus adjectus Zikan, 1935
 Mischocyttarus adolphi Zikan, 1949
 Mischocyttarus alboniger Richards, 1978
 Mischocyttarus alfkenii (Ducke, 1904)
 Mischocyttarus alienus Richards 1978
 Mischocyttarus alternatus Zikan, 1949
 Mischocyttarus anchicaya Silveira, 2015
 Mischocyttarus angulatus Richards 1945
 Mischocyttarus annulatus Richards, 1978
 Mischocyttarus anthracinus Richards, 1945
 Mischocyttarus arawak Silveira, 2013
 Mischocyttarus aripuanaensis Silveira, 1998
 Mischocyttarus artifex (Ducke, 1914)
 Mischocyttarus awa Silveira, 2013
 Mischocyttarus baconi Starr, 2011
 Mischocyttarus bahiae Richards, 1945
 Mischocyttarus bahiaensis Zikan 1949
 Mischocyttarus barbatulus Richards, 1978
 Mischocyttarus barbatus Richards 1945
 Mischocyttarus basimacula (Cameron, 1906)
 Mischocyttarus belemensis Cooper, 1997
 Mischocyttarus bequaertii Richards, 1945
 Mischocyttarus bertonii Ducke, 1918
 Mischocyttarus brackmanni Zikan 1949
 Mischocyttarus bruneri Bequard & Salt, 1931
 Mischocyttarus buyssoni (Ducke, 1906)
 Mischocyttarus cabauna Zikan, 1949
 Mischocyttarus caixuana Silveira, 2015
 Mischocyttarus campestris Raw, 1987
 Mischocyttarus capichaba Zikan 1949
 Mischocyttarus carbonarius (Saussure, 1854)
 Mischocyttarus carinulatus Zikan, 1949
 Mischocyttarus cassununga (Ihering, 1903)
 Mischocyttarus catharinaensis Zikan 1949
 Mischocyttarus cearensis Richards, 1945
 Mischocyttarus cerberus Ducke 1918
 Mischocyttarus chalucas Snelling, 1983
 Mischocyttarus chanchamayoensis Richards, 1978
 Mischocyttarus chapadae (Fox 1898)
 Mischocyttarus chloroecus Cooper, 1998
 Mischocyttarus cinerasceus Zikan 1949
 Mischocyttarus claretianus Zikan 1949
 Mischocyttarus clavicornis Cooper, 1997
 Mischocyttarus cleomenes Richards, 1945
 Mischocyttarus clypeatus Zikan 1935
 Mischocyttarus collarellus Richards, 1940
 Mischocyttarus collaris (Ducke, 1904)
 Mischocyttarus commixtus Richards 1945
 Mischocyttarus confirmatus Zikan 1935
 Mischocyttarus confusoides Zikan 1949
 Mischocyttarus confusus Zikan 1935
 Mischocyttarus consimilis Zikan 1949
 Mischocyttarus cooperi Richards, 1978
 Mischocyttarus costaricensis Richards 1945
 Mischocyttarus crypticus Zikan 1949
 Mischocyttarus cryptobius Zikán 1935
 Mischocyttarus cubensis (Saussure, 1854)
 Mischocyttarus curitybanus Zikan 1949
 Mischocyttarus deceptus (Fox, 1895)
 Mischocyttarus decimus Richards, 1978
 Mischocyttarus declaratus Zikan 1935
 Mischocyttarus dimorphus Zikan 1949
 Mischocyttarus drewseni (Saussure, 1854)
 Mischocyttarus duckei Buysson, 1909
 Mischocyttarus duidensis Richards 1945
 Mischocyttarus ecuadorensis Zikan 1949
 Mischocyttarus efferus Silveira, 2006
 Mischocyttarus elegantulus Zikan 1949
 Mischocyttarus embera Silveira, 2013
 Mischocyttarus extinctus Zikan 1935
 Mischocyttarus fidus Silveira, 2006
 Mischocyttarus filiformis (Saussure, 1854)
 Mischocyttarus filipendulus Cooper, 1998
 Mischocyttarus fisheri Snelling 1970
 Mischocyttarus fitzgeraldi Bequard, 1938
 Mischocyttarus flavicans (Fabricius, 1804)
 Mischocyttarus flavicornis Zikan 1935
 Mischocyttarus flavitarsis (Saussure 1854)
 Mischocyttarus flavoniger Zikan 1949
 Mischocyttarus flavoscutellatus Zikan 1935
 Mischocyttarus foveatus Richards, 1940
 Mischocyttarus fraudulentus Richards, 1978
 Mischocyttarus frontalis (Fox, 1898)
 Mischocyttarus funerulus Zikan 1949
 Mischocyttarus garbei Zikan 1935
 Mischocyttarus giffordi Raw, 1987
 Mischocyttarus gomesi Silveira, 2013
 Mischocyttarus gynandromorphus Richards, 1945
 Mischocyttarus haywardi Willink 1953
 Mischocyttarus heliconius Richards, 1941
 Mischocyttarus hirsutus Richards 1945
 Mischocyttarus hirtulus Zikan, 1949
 Mischocyttarus hoffmanni Zikan 1949
 Mischocyttarus ignotus Zikan 1949
 Mischocyttarus iheringi Zikan 1935
 Mischocyttarus illusorius Richards 1978
 Mischocyttarus imeldai Zikan 1949
 Mischocyttarus imitator (Ducke, 1904)
 Mischocyttarus inca Zikan 1949
 Mischocyttarus inexspectatus Cooper, 1997
 Mischocyttarus injucundus (Saussure, 1854)
 Mischocyttarus insolitus Zikan 1949
 Mischocyttarus interjectus Zikan 1935
 Mischocyttarus interruptus Richards, 1978
 Mischocyttarus juditae Cooper, 1997
 Mischocyttarus labiatus (Fabricius, 1804)
 Mischocyttarus lanei Zikan 1949
 Mischocyttarus latior (Fox, 1898)
 Mischocyttarus latissimus Richards, 1978
 Mischocyttarus laurae Silveira, 2006
 Mischocyttarus lecointei (Ducke, 1904)
 Mischocyttarus lemoulti (Buysson, 1909)
 Mischocyttarus leucoecus Cooper, 1998
 Mischocyttarus lilae Willink 1953
 Mischocyttarus lindigi Richards 1945
 Mischocyttarus longicornis Zikan 1949
 Mischocyttarus lules Willink 1953
 Mischocyttarus macarenae Cooper, 1998
 Mischocyttarus maculipennis Cooper, 1998
 Mischocyttarus magdalensis Silveira, 2006
 Mischocyttarus malaris Richards, 1978
 Mischocyttarus maracaensis Raw, 1989
 Mischocyttarus marginatus (Fox 1898)
 Mischocyttarus mastigophorus Richards 1978
 Mischocyttarus mattogrossoensis Zikan, 1935
 Mischocyttarus melanarius (Cameron, 1906)
 Mischocyttarus melanoleucus Richards, 1978
 Mischocyttarus melanops Cooper, 1996
 Mischocyttarus melanopygus Richards, 1945
 Mischocyttarus melanoxanthus Richards, 1978
 Mischocyttarus mendax Richards, 1978
 Mischocyttarus metathoracicus (Saussure, 1854)
 Mischocyttarus metoecus Richards, 1940
 Mischocyttarus mexicanus (Saussure, 1854)
 Mischocyttarus mimicus Zikan 1935
 Mischocyttarus minifoveatus Cooper, 1998
 Mischocyttarus mirificus Zikan 1935
 Mischocyttarus mirus Silveira, 2006
 Mischocyttarus mixtus Richards, 1978
 Mischocyttarus mocsaryi (Ducke, 1909)
 Mischocyttarus montei Zikan 1949
 Mischocyttarus montivagus Cooper, 1996
 Mischocyttarus moralesi Zikan, 1949
 Mischocyttarus moronae Cooper, 1996
 Mischocyttarus mourei Zikan 1949
 Mischocyttarus muisca Silveira, 2013
 Mischocyttarus mysticus Silveira, 2006
 Mischocyttarus napoensis Richards, 1978
 Mischocyttarus narinensis Cooper, 1998
 Mischocyttarus naumanni Richards, 1978
 Mischocyttarus navajo Bequard, 1933
 Mischocyttarus nigroclavatus Zikan 1949
 Mischocyttarus nigropygialis Zikan 1949
 Mischocyttarus nomurae Richards 1978
 Mischocyttarus occiduus Silveira, 2006
 Mischocyttarus occultus Cooper, 1996
 Mischocyttarus oecothrix Richards 1940
 Mischocyttarus omicron Richards, 1978
 Mischocyttarus onorei Cooper, 1996
 Mischocyttarus oreophilus Zikan 1949
 Mischocyttarus ornatus Zikan 1949
 Mischocyttarus pallidipectus (Smith 1857)
 Mischocyttarus pallidipes Richards, 1945
 Mischocyttarus pallidus Zikán 1949
 Mischocyttarus paraguayensis Zikan 1935
 Mischocyttarus parallelogrammus Zikan 1935
 Mischocyttarus paris Silveira, 2006
 Mischocyttarus paulistanus Zikan 1935
 Mischocyttarus peduncularius Zikan 1949
 Mischocyttarus pelor Carpenter 1988
 Mischocyttarus pertinax Silveira, 2006
 Mischocyttarus peruanus Zikan 1949
 Mischocyttarus peruviensis Richards 1945
 Mischocyttarus petiolatus Richards, 1978
 Mischocyttarus phthisicus (Fabricius 1793)
 Mischocyttarus piceus Zikan 1949
 Mischocyttarus picturatus Bequaert, 1938
 Mischocyttarus piger Richards, 1945
 Mischocyttarus plaumanni Zikan 1949
 Mischocyttarus polymorphus Cooper, 1998
 Mischocyttarus porantin Silveira, 2006
 Mischocyttarus prominulus Richards 1941
 Mischocyttarus proximus Zikan 1949
 Mischocyttarus pseudomimeticus (Schulz, 1903)
 Mischocyttarus punctatus (Ducke, 1904)
 Mischocyttarus reclusus Cooper, 1996
 Mischocyttarus reflexicollis Zikan 1949
 Mischocyttarus rhadinomerus Cooper, 1997
 Mischocyttarus richardsi Zikan 1949
 Mischocyttarus rodriguesi Silveira, 2015
 Mischocyttarus rotundicollis (Cameron, 1912)
 Mischocyttarus rufescens Zikan, 1949
 Mischocyttarus rufidens (Saussure, 1854)
 Mischocyttarus rufipes Zikan 1949
 Mischocyttarus rufomaculatus Richards 1945
 Mischocyttarus ryani Silveira, 2015
 Mischocyttarus santacruzi Raw, 2000
 Mischocyttarus saturatus Zikan, 1949
 Mischocyttarus saussurei Zikan 1949
 Mischocyttarus schadei Zikan 1949
 Mischocyttarus schunkei Zikan 1949
 Mischocyttarus sericeus Richards, 1978
 Mischocyttarus silvicola Zikan 1949
 Mischocyttarus smithii (Saussure, 1854)
 Mischocyttarus socialis (Saussure, 1854)
 Mischocyttarus souzalopesi Zikan 1949
 Mischocyttarus sprucei Cooper, 1997
 Mischocyttarus stenoecus Richards 1978
 Mischocyttarus subornatus Zikan 1949
 Mischocyttarus superus Richards, 1940
 Mischocyttarus surinamensis (Saussure, 1854)
 Mischocyttarus suzannae Silveira, 2013
 Mischocyttarus sylvestris Richards 1945
 Mischocyttarus synoecus Richards 1940
 Mischocyttarus tapuya (Schulz, 1905)
 Mischocyttarus tarmensis Richards 1945
 Mischocyttarus tayacaja Silveira, 2013
 Mischocyttarus tayrona Silveira, 2015
 Mischocyttarus tectus Cooper, 1996
 Mischocyttarus telembi Cooper, 1997
 Mischocyttarus tenuis Richards 1945
 Mischocyttarus tertius Richards, 1978
 Mischocyttarus thrypticus Richards 1945
 Mischocyttarus timbira Silveira, 2006
 Mischocyttarus tolensis Richards 1941
 Mischocyttarus tomentosus Zikan, 1935
 Mischocyttarus transandinus Richards, 1978
 Mischocyttarus travassosi Zikan 1949
 Mischocyttarus tricolor Richards 1945
 Mischocyttarus tunari Cooper, 1996
 Mischocyttarus undulatus (Ducke, 1905)
 Mischocyttarus uniformis Silveira, 2013
 Mischocyttarus vaqueroi Zikan, 1949
 Mischocyttarus veracrucis Cooper, 1997
 Mischocyttarus verissimoi Silveira, 2015
 Mischocyttarus villarricanus Zikan 1935
 Mischocyttarus vredeni Richards, 1978
 Mischocyttarus wagneri (Buysson, 1908)
 Mischocyttarus waunan Silveira, 2013
 Mischocyttarus weyrauchi Zikan 1949
 Mischocyttarus woytkowskyi Richards, 1978
 Mischocyttarus wygodzinskyi Zikan, 1949
 Mischocyttarus xanthocerus Richards 1945
 Mischocyttarus xavante Silveira, 2010
 Mischocyttarus ypiranguensis Fonseca, 1926
 Mischocyttarus zikaninus Richards, 1978

References

Vespidae